The Okaramio River is a river of the Marlborough Region of  New Zealand's South Island. It flows into the Kaituna River approximately halfway between Renwick and Havelock.

See also
List of rivers of New Zealand

References
 

Rivers of the Marlborough Region
Rivers of New Zealand